"Where Does the Good Times Go" is a 1967 single by Buck Owens.  "Where Does the Good Times Go" was a number one country hit spending four weeks at the top spot and fourteen weeks on the chart.

Chart performance

References

1966 singles
Buck Owens songs
Songs written by Buck Owens
Song recordings produced by Ken Nelson (American record producer)
Capitol Records singles
1966 songs